Lode Runner Online: The Mad Monks' Revenge (stylized as Lode Runner On-Line) is an enhanced version of the 1994 game Lode Runner: The Legend Returns.  The game includes online functionality so that players can battle or work together via network play.  Despite the name, the game can be played as single-player and offline.

Gameplay
While maintaining all of the original features of The Legend Returns, Lode Runner Online adds several new features, such as bombs which constantly self-ignite and reappear on a set timer. New available "worlds", which determine background and terrain appearance on a map, are a chief addition. New hazards, such as phase blocks, which disappear and reappear on a set timer (and consequently can tear apart players or monks standing in the location of a vanished block in the process of reappearing), and items are among other additional features; notably, editors can specify certain items to be able to be picked up by only the player of corresponding color (e.g. bombs with blue outlines can only be picked up by the second player, Wes Reckless, not Jake Peril).

The level editor is more complex than in the original game. Multiple exits can be placed in a level, and the exits can be programmed to lead to differing levels in a pack.

Development

In 1993, Presage Software acquired the rights to the classic Lode Runner game by Doug Smith and set out to create a new, updated version for modern machines.

The result of this effort was Lode Runner: The Legend Returns. This game did phenomenally well, winning many awards and leading to an enhanced edition: Lode Runner Online. For this iteration, multi-player gameplay was added, allowing two persons to play Lode Runner together over a network, modem, or on the same machine. At the same time many new levels and game elements were introduced, and the original 16-bit code was updated to 32-bit for Windows 95 and Mac OS 8.

Reception

External links
DaggertWeb - Lode Runner by Beth Daggert, lead programmer. Includes numerous full version of the game.

Fan-made remake with updated features for modern OS's.

1995 video games
Classic Mac OS games
Multiplayer and single-player video games
Presage Software games
Puzzle-platform games
Sierra Entertainment games
Video game remakes
Video games developed in the United States
Windows games